Robertus Wilhelmus Cornelis Eras (born 6 April 1954) is a Dutch equestrian. He competed in two events at the 1976 Summer Olympics.

References

External links
 

1954 births
Living people
Dutch male equestrians
Olympic equestrians of the Netherlands
Equestrians at the 1976 Summer Olympics
People from Goirle
Sportspeople from North Brabant